John Tremayne may refer to:

John Tremayne (fl. 1388), MP for Truro (UK Parliament constituency) in 1388
 John Tremayne (1647–1694), English lawyer and politician, Serjeant-at-Law and King's Serjeant, MP for Tregony
 John Hearle Tremayne (1780–1851), Cornish MP and High Sheriff of Cornwall in 1831
 John Tremayne (1825–1901), MP for constituencies in both Cornwall and Devon, and High Sheriff of Cornwall in 1859
 John Claude Lewis Tremayne (1869–1949), last squire of Heligan and better known as "Jack", see Lost Gardens of Heligan
 John Tremayne Babington (1891–1979), later John Tremayne Tremayne, British Air Marshal and High Sheriff of Cornwall in 1954
 John Tremayne (died 1504), of Tremayne & Collacombe, High Sheriff of Cornwall in 1485 & 1487
 John Tremayne (of Heligan), High Sheriff of Cornwall in 1745